Chakravyuha is a 2016 Indian Kannada-language vigilante action film written and directed by M. Saravanan and produced by N. K. Lohith under the Sunshine Creations banner. An adaptation of Saravanan's own Tamil-language film Ivan Veramathiri, the film stars Puneeth Rajkumar, Rachita Ram, and Arun Vijay, while Abhimanyu Singh, Sadhu Kokila, Bhavya, and Rangayana Raghu play supporting roles. S. Thaman composed the film's score and soundtrack. 

The film was dubbed in Hindi with the same name by Shree International and is dubbed and released in Telugu as Civil Engineer. The key sequences of the film (not found in the Tamil version) went on to be re-used in the Odia remake version Abhaya (2017).

Plot
Sadashivayya, who was a former gangster and present Karnataka State Law minister asks for an illegal quota in student admissions in Government Law College, but the principal refuses. In order to remove the principal, he instigates violence in the law college campus using his students in the college. One of the students manages to come out of the campus, but gets badly wounded. Before fainting, he reveals Sadashivayya's plan to a Civil Engineer named Lohith. Lohith, along with his compounder friend Sadhu, takes the student to the hospital and learns that he is suffering from blood loss. 

Lohith then takes Anjali, a college student where he makes her to donate blood, but the next day the student dies, and his grief-stricken mother screams in public. Lohith takes the incident seriously and kidnaps Omkaar, who is the paroled-brother of the Sadashivayya and the prepatators behind the violence in the college, where he locks him in an abandoned construction site. The next day, Omkaar tries to escape, but Lohith disguises himself where he thrashes Omkaar and locks him in another room. Sadashivayya tries to find Omkaar, but to no avail where he is arrested as he had given legal assurance for his brother's parole. 

Lohith then leaves Omkaar in the highway and Omkaar is taken to the hospital by his henchmen. When he learns of his brother's imprisonment, He swears vengeance on Lohith and decide to track Lohith secretly by pretending to be unstable. When the police learn about Omkaar's plan, they try to arrest him, but Omkar escapes and Omkaar stops a biker for lift, who is revealed to be Lohith. Lohith manages to subdue the police. Soon after, Omkaar escapes leaving Lohith. Omkaar then realizes that Lohith was the kidnapper. Later, Anjali, who is in love with Lohith teases him, to which Lohith angrily rejects Anjali. 

Though devastated, Anjali selflessly calls Omkaar and tells him that she knows the kidnapper. At the hideout, Anjali shows him an article that he crashed in a bike accident. Omkaar knows Anjali was lying where he kidnaps her and brings her to the same building where Lohith had kept Omkaar for days. Meanwhile, ACP Raghu starts interrogating Sadashivayya. Just then, Sadashivayya tries to escape, but Raghu shoots him. Omkaar challenges Lohith to save the people who are beloved to him. 

Lohith then reaches his home when he deduce that Omkaar was about to kidnap his mother. Lohith thrashes the goons where he brings Omkaar to the same building to learn where Anjali is kept hostage. Lohith manages to save Anjali. When he is taking her to the hospital, Omkaar tries to attack Lohith, but ACP Raghu shoots and kills Omkaar where he salutes Lohith and tells him to leave, Lohith leaves with Anjali and they reunite.

Cast 
 Puneeth Rajkumar as Lohith
 Rachita Ram as Anjali
 Arun Vijay as Omkaar
 Abhimanyu Singh as Sadashivayya, Law Minister
 Sadhu Kokila as Sadhu
 Rangayana Raghu as ACP Raghu
 Bhavya as Lohith's mother
 Sandeep Yadav as a spy
 Sithara as a  student's mother
 Kichcha Sudeep as narrator (voiceover only)

Production
The movie made a profit before its release. As per sources, the distribution and audio rights of the movie had been sold out for an amount of ₹14 crores.

Development
In February 2015, it was reported that M. Saravanan and Puneeth Rajkumar would work together for the first time. S. Thaman was selected to compose the music for the film. Chakravyuha, was greatly anticipated because of the associated marketing.

Casting
Rachita Ram was roped into playing the lead actress role, which marked her debut collaboration with Puneeth Rajkumar. Incidentally, actor Vamsi Krishna was approached by director Saravanan to reprise the role he had done in the original, Ivan Veramathiri. However, the dates did not work out, and the role was offered to his friend Arun Vijay.

Filming
The film went on the floors in 2015. A song shoot has been shot in Portugal. This is the first Kannada movie whose song is shot in Portugal.

Release
The film release is planned for 29 April 2016, with a premier on 28 April at Australia. It is set to have a global opening and planned to release in more than 50 countries, including the UK, South Africa, Hong Kong, Singapore, Malaysia, UAE, US and Canada.

Soundtrack

Songs of the movie have been released on 17 March 2016, coinciding with the birthday of the actor Puneeth Rajkumar.

S. Thaman composed the soundtrack album (containing 4 songs) and background score for the film. The song recording of the movie commenced already, Telugu actor N. T. Rama Rao Jr. sung a song Geleya Geleya, which was his first playback singing in Kannada film and Kajal Aggarwal sung a song Yenaithu, which was her first playback singing in any language, despite not knowing Kannada language. The beginning portion of the song "Ninthalli Nillalaare" reuses a part of Thaman's "Megastar Intro Theme" from Bruce Lee: The Fighter (2015).

The album was also released in Hindi it contains 3 songs and all lyrics by Shree International Company

Critical reception 
Chakravyuha received mixed reviews from critics. 

Bangalore Mirror wrote "how it was interesting that the hero's name is used only four times in the entire movie, that too in the second half only".

Awards and nominations

Mirchi Music Awards
Star as A Singing Sensation - Jr. NTR 

6th South Indian International Movie Awards:
 Best Actor in a Negative Role – Kannada – Nominated – Arun Vijay
 Best Male Playback Singer – Kannada – Nominated - Jr. NTR

References

External links
 

2016 films
2010s Kannada-language films
Films scored by Thaman S
Kannada remakes of Tamil films
Indian action thriller films
2016 action thriller films
Films shot in Bangalore
Indian films about revenge
Films shot in Lisbon
Films about corruption in India
Indian action drama films
Films about kidnapping in India
Films set in Bangalore
Indian nonlinear narrative films
2016 action drama films
2010s vigilante films
Indian vigilante films